Inessa Zakhareuskaya (born 14 August 1973) is a Belarusian rower. She competed in the women's eight event at the 2000 Summer Olympics.

References

1973 births
Living people
Belarusian female rowers
Olympic rowers of Belarus
Rowers at the 2000 Summer Olympics
Sportspeople from Minsk